The Artwoods (also sometimes known by Decca Records as the Art Woods) were an English rock band who formed in 1963 and were professionally active between 1964 and 1967. They were a popular live attraction, rivalling groups such as the Animals, although, despite releasing a clutch of singles and an album, their record sales never reflected this popularity.

History
Singer Arthur Wood, from whom the band took their name, was the eldest brother of Ronnie Wood (who later found fame with the Faces and Rolling Stones). Art Wood had been a vocalist with Alexis Korner's Blues Incorporated for a short period during 1962, simultaneously fronting his own group, the Art Wood Combo. When keyboardist Jon Lord and guitarist Derek Griffiths from Red Bludd's Bluesicians joined the Art Wood Combo, the Artwoods were formed. With Keef Hartley, formerly with Rory Storm & the Hurricanes, joining on drums and Malcolm Pool from the Roadrunners joining as bassist, in December 1964 the band turned professional, securing a residency at London's 100 Club and signing a recording contract with Decca Records.
Colin Martin joined from the band the Ingoes, who changed their name to the Blossom Toes. Colin went on to work at Radio 2 where he produced the like of Terry Wogan, Ken Bruce and Gloria Hunniford and was later appointed as Head of Music at the station.

The intended debut single, a cover of Muddy Waters' "Hoochie Coochie Man", was shelved in favour of a rendition of an old Lead Belly song, "Sweet Mary". Although it didn't reach the charts, it got sufficient airplay to bring the band a lot of live work, including an appearance on the first live edition of Ready Steady Go!. Their second record, "Oh My Love", was another blues cover. Like its predecessor (and subsequent releases), it failed to chart. Their only chart single was "I Take What I Want", which reached No 28 on 8 May 1966.

The Artwoods were dropped by Decca at the end of 1966, and they signed a one-record deal with Parlophone, but their release "What Shall I Do" also had no success. Later in 1967, a final "one-off" single appeared on the Fontana label, with the band billing itself as St. Valentine's Day Massacre; but by the time of its release the Artwoods had effectively ceased to exist.

The Artwoods' early records today stand up well against the work of more successful groups such as the Rolling Stones, the Yardbirds or the Birds (who included Art's younger brother Ronnie). But at the time they came out, despite appearances on programs like Ready, Steady, Go! their singles never seemed to connect with the record-buying public. The group broke up in mid-1967. Art Wood joined his brother Ted in the graphics-art business and continued to perform music on a semi-professional basis. He also played with the Downliners Sect. Keef Hartley went on to play with John Mayall's Bluesbreakers and Jon Lord became a founder member of Deep Purple.

Over the years, there have been two compilations released by the band. In 1983, 100 Oxford Street, including most of their mid-'60s singles and seven songs from Art Gallery, was released by Edsel Records. In 2000, Singles A's & B's, comprising the group's entire single and EP output, was released by Repertoire Records.

Band members
Art Wood – lead vocals (born Arthur Wood, 6 June 1937, in West Drayton, Middlesex; died 3 November 2006, in London)
Derek Griffiths – lead guitar (born Derek Charles Griffiths, 23 June 1944, in England)
Jon Lord – organ (born John Douglas Lord, 9 June 1941, in Leicester, Leicestershire; died 16 July 2012)
Malcolm Pool – bass guitar (born 10 January 1943, in Hayes End, Middlesex)
Keef Hartley – drums (born Keith Hartley, 8 March 1944, in Preston, Lancashire, died there 26 November 2011)
Colin Martin – drums (born 18 March 1945, in Leyton, East London)

Discography

Singles
"Sweet Mary"/"If I Ever Get My Hands on You" (Decca F 12015) Nov 1964
"Oh My Love"/"Big City" (Decca F 12091) Feb '65
"Goodbye Sisters"/"She Knows What To Do" (Decca F 12206) Aug 1965
"I Take What I Want"/"I'm Looking For A Saxophonist Doubling French Horn Wearing Size 37 Boots" (Decca F 12384) Apr 1966
"I Feel Good"/"Molly Anderson's Cookery Book" (Decca F 12465) Aug 1966
"What Shall I Do"/"In The Deep End" (Parlophone R 5590) Apr 1967
"Brother Can You Spare A Dime"/"Al's Party" (Fontana H883) (as St. Valentine's Day Massacre) 1967

EPs 
Oh My Love ["Oh My Love"/"Big City"/"If I Ever Get My Hands On You"/"Sweet Mary"] (Decca 457.076 M) 1966
Jazz in Jeans ["These Boots Are Made For Walkin'"/"A Taste Of Honey"/"Our Man Flint"/"Routine"] (Decca DFE 8654) 1966
The Artwoods ["I Take What I Want" (Hayes/Porter/Hodges)/"If I Ever get My Hands on You" (Carter/Lewis)/"I Feel Good" (Neville)/"She Knows What To Do" (Hill/Rebennack)] (Decca DFE 8576) Reissue, 2009 in Japan

Albums

Studio album 
Art Gallery (Decca, LK4830) Nov 1966
Art Gallery [Reissue] (Repertoire, REP4533-WP) 1995

Live albums 
Live at Klooks Kleek (Diamond) 2016
Art's Gallery (Top Sounds) 2019

Compilation albums

 The Artwoods (Spark, SRLM2006) 1974
 100 Oxford Street (Edsel, ED107) 1983
 Singles A's & B's (Repertoire, REP4887) 2000
 Steady Gettin' It – The Complete Recordings 1964–67 (RPM) 2014

References

External links
[  The Artwoods] at Allmusic

English pop music groups
Musical groups established in 1964
Musical groups disestablished in 1967
Beat groups
1964 establishments in England
1967 disestablishments in England